Bainey is a surname. Notable people with the surname include:

Kenrick Bainey (born 1955), Trinidadian cricketer
Tim Bainey Jr. (born 1978), American stock car racing driver